Togo Renan Soares, also commonly known as Kanela (22 May 1906 – 12 December 1992) was a Brazilian professional basketball coach, football coach, water polo coach, and rowing coach. He was born in Parahyba do Norte (present-day João Pessoa), Brazil. The gymnasium Gávea, is named after him. He was enshrined into the FIBA Hall of Fame in 2007.

Club football managerial career
Kanela was the head coach of the Brazilian football club Botafogo F.R., (1929–1936). He was also the Brazilian football club C.R. Flamengo's head coach, (1948–49).

Club basketball coaching career
Kanela began his basketball coaching career as the head coach of the Brazilian club Botafogo F.R. Basquete. With Botafoga, he won 6 Rio de Janeiro State Championships. He was next the head coach of the Brazilian club C.R. Flamengo Basquete, (1948–1970). He led Flamengo to 14 Rio de Janeiro State Championships, including 10 in a row, between 1951 and 1960. With Flamengo, he also won the South American Club Championship, in 1953.

His next club was S.E. Palmeiras, with which he won the São Paulo State Championship in 1972. He ended his club coaching career with Vila Nova, with which he won the Brazilian Championship, in 1973.

National basketball team coaching career
Kanela also coached the senior Brazilian national basketball team. He led them to two gold medals at the FIBA World Cup, in 1959 (beating the USSR in the final game) and 1963 (beating the USA in the final game). He also led them to the following medals: silver medals at the 1954 FIBA World Cup and 1970 FIBA World Cup, a bronze medal at the 1960 Summer Olympics, a bronze medal at the 1967 FIBA World Cup, a silver medal at the 1963 Pan American Games, bronze medals at the 1951 Pan American Games and 1959 Pan American Games, and to five gold medals at the FIBA South American Championship (1958, 1960, 1961, 1963, 1971).

Coaching career in other sports
In addition to coaching in the sports of football and basketball, Kanela also worked as a water polo coach and a rowing coach, with Botafoga F.R.

Personal
Kanela died in Rio de Janeiro, in 1992, at age 86.

See also 
 FIBA Basketball World Cup winning head coaches

External links
 FIBA Hall of Fame Profile

1906 births
1992 deaths
Botafogo de Futebol e Regatas basketball coaches
Botafogo de Futebol e Regatas managers
Brazilian basketball coaches
Brazilian football managers
CR Flamengo managers
FIBA Hall of Fame inductees
Flamengo basketball coaches
Medalists at the 1960 Summer Olympics
Olympic bronze medalists for Brazil
Sociedade Esportiva Palmeiras basketball coaches
Water polo coaches
Vila Nova Basquete Clube coaches